USS John P. Murtha (LPD-26) is the 10th  ship of the United States Navy, and is named in honor of Congressman John Murtha (1932–2010) of Pennsylvania. John P. Murtha is homeported at Naval Base San Diego.

History
On 9 April 2010,Secretary of the Navy Ray Mabus announced that the Navy's 10th San Antonio-class amphibious transport dock would be named  John P. Murtha (LPD-26). A former United States Marine Corps officer, Murtha was the first Vietnam War veteran elected to the U.S. House of Representatives, in 1974. Murtha served as either chairman or ranking minority member of the House Defense Appropriations Subcommitteee from 1989 to 2010.

The contract to build John P. Murtha was awarded to  Ingalls Shipbuilding on 1 April 2011. John P. Murtha keel was laid down on 6 June 2012 at the Ingalls Shipbuilding yard in Pascagoula, Mississippi.
The ship was launched on 30 October 2014, christened five months later on 21 March 2015, delivered to the Navy on 13 May 2016, placed in active service on 11 August 2016, and commissioned on 8 October 2016. The ship was sponsored by Congressman Murtha's daughter, Donna S. Murtha.

Naming controversy
The decision to deviate from the naming convention for the class, which prior to John P. Murtha had been named after cities or locations, was not without controversy. Some members of Congress questioned the appropriateness of naming a military vessel for Murtha after his call for withdrawing from the Iraq War in 2005 and his public accusation of Marines involved in the Haditha incident.  Similar questions arose when, in 2012, Secretary Mabus proposed naming  after former Congresswoman Gabby Giffords.  In connection with this controversy, Sen. Roy Blunt added an amendment to the 2012 National Defense Authorization Act which required the Navy to report to Congress on how effectively it was adhering to established naming conventions.

References

Further reading

External links 

 

San Antonio-class amphibious transport docks
2014 ships
Ships built in Pascagoula, Mississippi